Chuba Wilberforce Okadigbo (17 December 1941 – 25 September 2003), was a Nigerian philosopher, academic, writer and political scientist. He served as Senate president of Nigeria from 1999 to 2000. Okadigbo was sometimes referred to as Oyi of Oyi in reference to his local government council area (Oyi); he also held numerous political positions in the Nigeria government and was known to have opposed the ruling Peoples Democratic Party of Nigeria, which was led by President Olusẹgun Ọbasanjọ from the year 1999–2007.

Biography
Born in Asaba, Delta State, Chuba is from Umueri, Ogbunike a town in Oyi Local Government Area of Anambra State. After graduating from The Catholic University of America in Washington D.C. with a Masters in Political Science, Chuba went further by acquiring two doctorate degrees in Philosophy and Political Science in Washington, D.C. Chuba Okadigbo became Assistant professor, later adjunct associate professor of philosophy University of the District of Columbia, adjunct assistant professor of politics the Catholic University of America, and adjunct assistant professor of politics Howard University. He accomplished all these by the age of 34 and in such a short time from 1973 to 1975.

Between 1975 and 1978, he became director-general Center for Interdisciplinary and Political Studies, and a lecturer in philosophy University of Nigeria, Nsukka. He also became a professor of philosophy Bigard Memorial Senior Seminary [Roman Catholic Mission] in Enugu State.

In 1979, at the age of 37 he was appointed as the Political Adviser and strategist to then president, Shehu Shagari. In the third republic he belonged to the Peoples Front which joined the Social Democratic Party under the leadership of Shehu Musa Yar'Adua together with politicians such as Atiku Abubakar, Babagana Kingibe, Abdullahi Aliyu Sumaila, Sunday Afolabi and Rabiu Kwankwaso.He was a member of the Peoples Democratic Movement (PDM) during the Sani Abacha transition program. At the dawn of the fourth republic, He was elected into the National Assembly (Anambra North) and was favorite to be the Senate President at the commencement of the democratic government in the Fourth Republic. However, due to Chuba's disharmony with the executive arm, Evan Enwerem was voted in by the senate with the support of the executive arm. However, he inevitably became President of the Nigerian Senate, after the impeachment of Evan Enwerem due to corrupt practices. On Friday 2 June 2000 the Police lay siege to his official residence in an operation to seize the Senate Mace from him but failed. Later on in 2000, he was falsely charged for corruption and impeached, officially demoting him from Senate President to a senator.

In 2002 Okadigbo decamped to the All Nigeria Peoples Party to become Muhammadu Buhari's running mate in the 2003 Presidential elections, but lost to the People's Democratic Party's candidate, Olusẹgun Ọbasanjọ and his running mate, Atiku Abubakar by a landslide victory. Because of possible mass rigging, his party later took the matter to the supreme court that year.

Controversy (involving Nnamdi Azikiwe) 
As the political adviser to the Shagari's government, Okadigbo once dismissed Dr. Nnamdi Azikiwe's criticism of the administration, deeming it "rantings of an ant". In return, Dr. Nnamdi Azikiwe responded to Okadigbo that he will die unsung for the futility of abusing old age. Okadigbo was amongst the selected members of a burial committee to oversee Azikiwe's burial when the news of his death broke in 1989. The news later turned out to be false.

Death
A day after campaigning in Kano State, he died in Abuja due to breathing problems; on September 25, 2003. Though, some people around Nigeria questioned whether or not the tear gas used during the rally was poisonous.

Personal life 
Okadigbo was first married to Miriam Ikejiani-Clark, and they had four children before divorcing.Then, he was married to Juliet Nwokoye, a Pediatrician in which he had two children before they divorced. ref></ref> He later married Magery Okadigbo who also became a senator in 2015, elected into the 8th National Assembly representing Anambra North, which makes Chuba and Margery the only married couple to have achieved this feat.

References

 CHUBA OKADIGBO: A big tree has fallen (1941-2003)
 Nigeria: old wine in new bottles?
 Nigeria: Corruption Timeline
  Nigeria's senate president impeached

Igbo politicians
1941 births
University of the District of Columbia faculty
Catholic University of America School of Arts and Sciences faculty
Howard University faculty
2003 deaths
Presidents of the Senate (Nigeria)
Nigerian Roman Catholics
Peoples Democratic Party members of the Senate (Nigeria)
Nigerian expatriate academics in the United States
People from Anambra State
Igbo academics
20th-century Nigerian politicians
21st-century Nigerian politicians
Catholic University of America alumni